Illumination is the nineteenth studio album by American band Earth, Wind & Fire, released in September 2005 on Sanctuary Records. The album rose to No. 8 on the Billboard Top R&B/Hip-Hop Albums chart and No. 32 on the Billboard 200 chart. Illumination was also Grammy nominated within the category of Best R&B Album. It is the last Earth, Wind & Fire album to feature their founder and co-lead vocalist Maurice White.

Overview
Artists such as Big Boi, Kenny G, Kelly Rowland, will.i.am, Floetry and Brian McKnight featured on Illumination.

Singles
A track titled "Pure Gold" rose to No. 23 on the Billboard Adult Contemporary singles chart and No. 15 on the Billboard Adult R&B Songs chart.

Another single titled "The Way You Move" feat. Kenny G reached No. 12 on the Billboard Adult Contemporary Songs chart.

A song called "Show Me the Way" feat. Raphael Saadiq rose to No. 16 upon the Billboard Adult R&B Songs chart. "Show Me the Way" was also Grammy nominated in the category of  Best R&B Performance by a Duo or Group with Vocals.

Another track titled "To You" which featured Brian McKnight reached No. 16 upon the Billboard Adult R&B Songs chart and No. 29 on the Billboard Smooth Jazz Songs chart.

Critical reception

Raymond Fiore of Entertainment Weekly declared  "Earth, Wind & Fire’s Illumination is a fluid, unforced marriage of modern beats and retro, horn-lined soul.". Antony Hatfield of the BBC stated "Illumination is a great all star team effort, which should appeal to fans of all concerned." Bill Lamb of About gave a four out of five star rating and found that "Illumination is a truly classic package" that "effortlessly straddles the divide between classic and contemporary r&b." Jim Farber of the New York Daily News said "Their latest work features production and/or guest appearances from current hit makers like Will I. Am from the Black Eyed Peas, Big Boi from OutKast, Kelly Rowland from Destiny's Child, plus Jimmy Jam and Terry Lewis, Raphael Saadiq and others. All these guests haven't overwhelmed Maurice White's great band. They've just freshened it up. Singer Philip Bailey sounds as buttery as ever, and the band's tart horn arrangements and melodies extend the buoyancy and pleasure of their hits." Ben Thompson of The Daily Telegraph wrote "Illumination does find them successfully holding their own alongside some of the biggest names of the 21st century." People proclaimed "Illumination, Earth, Wind & Fire’s 23rd album, shows that after 35 years the R&B/funk pioneers are still shining stars.". Dave Simpson of The Guardian gave a four out of five star rating, describing the album as "an often storming return to form." With a 3 out of 5 star rating Steve Jones of USA Today noted "EWF is as vibrant as ever".

Illumination was Grammy nominated in the category of Best R&B Album. The album was also nominated for a Soul Train Music Award in the category of Best R&B/Soul Album – Group, Band or Duo. As well Earth, Wind & Fire was nominated for an NAACP Image Award in the category of Outstanding Duo or Group.

Uses in other media
"This Is How I Feel" was featured in the movie Hitch and "Love's Dance" was featured in the feature film Robots. "Pure Gold" was featured in the movie Roll Bounce.

Track listing

Bonus tracks

2020 Reissue

Bonus tracks

Credits and personnel
EWF Members and Guest Performances
Marsha Ambrosius (of Floetry) - background vocals (10)
Philip Bailey - lead vocals (sung by) (1-2, 4, 7-8, 10, 13), background vocals (1-2, 4-5, 7-10, 12-13), bongos (6), percussion (1, 5)
Big Boi - rap vocals (6)
Sleepy Brown - lead vocals (6), piano, background vocals (9)
Kenny G - saxophone (13)
Ralph Johnson - additional percussion (11)
Myron McKinley - keyboards (11)
Brian McKnight - lead vocals, background vocals, guitar, keyboards (12)
Greg Moore - guitar (11)
Kelly Rowland - lead vocals (6)
Raphael Saadiq - lead vocals (5, 14), background vocals (5, 8), piano (8), percussion (5), bass played by (5, additional on 8), guitar (5, 7-8)
Natalie Stewart (of Floetry) - lead vocals (10)
Maurice White - lead vocals (1-2, 5, 8-9, 12-13), background vocals (1-2, 4-5, 7-9, 12-13), kalimba (1, 4, 10)
Verdine White - bass played by (1-2, 4, 6, 8, 11)
will.i.am - lead vocals, background vocals (1)
Vadim Zilberstein - additional guitar (12)

Horn Section
Gary Bias (of EWF) - saxophone (1-2, 4-9, 13)
Jeff Bradshaw - horn arrangements, trombone (10)
Ray Brown - horn orchestrations (7)
Matt Cappy - horn arrangements, trumpet (10)
EWF Horns - additional horns performed by (13)
Gary Grant - trumpet (1-2, 4, 6, 9, 13)
Keith Harris - horn arrangements (1)
Jerry Hey - horn arrangements (1-2, 4, 13), horn orchestrations (6, 9), trumpet (1-2, 4, 6, 9, 13)
Jimmy Jam - horn arrangements (2, 4)
Bill Meyers - horn arrangements (5)
Bobby Rodriguez - trumpet (5)
Raphael Saadiq - horn arrangements (7-8)
Nolan Shaheed - trumpet (7-8)
Reggie Young (of EWF) - trombone (1-2, 4-9, 13)

String Section
South Central Chamber Orchestra - strings performed by (9)
Charles Veal Jr. - orchestral arrangements (9)
Kelvin Wooten - string arrangements (5)

Additional Musicians
Walter Afanasieff - keyboards, B3 organ played by (13)
Bobby Ross Avila - Rhodes electric piano (2), other keyboards, guitar (2, 4)
Issiah J. "IZ" Avila - drums, percussion (2, 4)
Junius Bervine - additional keyboards (11)
Preston Crump - additional bass played by (6)
Vikter Duplaix - drum machine, synth bass, additional keyboards (11)
Prescott "Glenn P" Ellison - drums (12)
Peter Michael Escovedo - percussion (13)
Keith Harris - drums, keyboards (1)
Darren Henson - all other instruments (10)
Doc Holiday - background vocals (5, 8, 12)
Jimmy Jam - Rhodes electric piano (4)
Emanuel Kiriakou - electric guitar (13)
Organized Noize - drum machine (6, 9)
Bobby Ozuna - drums, percussion (7-8)
Khari Parker - drums (5)
Keith Pelzer - all other instruments (10)
Neal H. Pogue - additional percussion (6)
Prof T. - background vocals (2, 4)
Dave Robbins - keyboards (6)
Chimere Scott - background vocals (9)
Shorty B - guitar (6)
Kelvin Wooten - keyboards (5, 7), bass played by (7)

Other Arrangers
Walter Afanasieff - musical arrangements, rhythm programming (13)
Emanuel Kiriakou - music programming (13)
Organized Noize - music programming (6, 9)
will.i.am - music programming (1)

Charts
Albums 

Singles

References

2005 albums
Sanctuary Records albums
Neo soul albums
Hip hop soul albums
Albums produced by Maurice White
Albums produced by Brian McKnight
Albums produced by Raphael Saadiq
Earth, Wind & Fire albums
Albums produced by Jimmy Jam and Terry Lewis
Albums produced by Philip Bailey